Unconquered is a lost 1917 American drama silent film directed by Frank Reicher and written by Beatrice DeMille and Leighton Osmun. The film stars Fannie Ward, Jack Dean, Hobart Bosworth, Tully Marshall, Mabel Van Buren and Jane Wolfe. The film was released on May 31, 1917, by Paramount Pictures.

Plot

Cast 
Fannie Ward as Mrs. Jackson
Jack Dean as Richard Darcier
Hobart Bosworth as Henry Jackson
Tully Marshall as Juke
Mabel Van Buren as Mrs. Lenning
Jane Wolfe as Voodoo Queen
Billy Jacobs as Little Billy

References

External links 
 

1917 films
1910s English-language films
Silent American drama films
1917 drama films
Paramount Pictures films
American black-and-white films
American silent feature films
Lost American films
1917 lost films
Lost drama films
Films directed by Frank Reicher
1910s American films